Sanikiluaq Airport  is located at Sanikiluaq, Nunavut, Canada, and is operated by the Government of Nunavut. It is one of the few airports in Nunavut that uses magnetic headings for the runway rather than true headings.

Airlines and destinations

Accidents and incidents
 On December 22, 2012, a Fairchild Metro III twin-engine turboprop aircraft belonging to Perimeter Aviation but chartered by Kivalliq Air crashed near the end of the runway at Sanikiluaq Airport, killing a 6-month-old baby and injuring the 8 other people on board. The cause was not immediately known.

References

External links

Certified airports in the Qikiqtaaluk Region
Belcher Islands